Al Mada ( al-Madā) is a daily Arabic newspaper published in Baghdad, Iraq. The founder of the daily which was first published on 5 August 2003 is Fakhri Karim, an Iraqi former communist. The publisher is Al-Mada Foundation for Media, Culture and Arts.  The paper has an independent political stance.

See also
Newspapers in Iraq

References

External links
 Official website

2003 establishments in Iraq
Arabic-language newspapers
Mass media in Baghdad
Newspapers published in Iraq
Publications established in 2003